George Silver (14 November 1916 – June 1984) was an English actor, born in London.

He was an actor, best known for The Meaning of Life (1983), Victor/Victoria (1982) and The Adventure of Sherlock Holmes' Smarter Brother (1975).

Because of his considerable body weight, Silver was often cast in parts where the preparation or consumption of food was a central activity, or where physical bulk was a major element of the characterisation. In Stephen Frears' 1971 'spoof-noir' thriller Gumshoe, his role was to play a modern approximation of the 1940s Sidney Greenstreet 'Fat Man' character.

Silver died in June, 1984.

Filmography

References

External links 
 

1916 births
1984 deaths
English male film actors
Male actors from London
20th-century English male actors